Southern Oak Stadium is home to the Jacksonville Dolphins Soccer team. The stadium was, also, home to the 2015 Atlantic Sun Conference Women's Lacrosse Championship. Jacksonville Armada FC have also played some home games at Southern Oak Stadium.

References

External links
Southern Oaks Stadium on the Jacksonville Dolphins Site

Jacksonville Dolphins
Multi-purpose stadiums in the United States
Sports venues in Jacksonville, Florida
Soccer venues in Florida
Jacksonville Armada FC